Radio Bemerton is a community radio station in Wiltshire, England. The station was established in 2000 in order to provide training and learning opportunities for adults in the Bemerton Heath area of the city of Salisbury. It is operated by Wiltshire Community Media Foundation, a not-for-profit company.

The project regularly recruits members from the local area and provides training in broadcast skills. The wider aim, however, is to provide an opportunity for its members to gain better skills in all forms of communication including, reading, writing and general conversational skills.

Training is ongoing, however, each year the radio station stages a live broadcast period ranging from 1 to 28 days in duration. The broadcast is essentially a showcase for the work prepared in previous months by its members and allows the project to reach the wider community.

When broadcasting, Radio Bemerton covers an area of approximately 8 miles from its purpose-built studios on Bemerton Heath. The station broadcasts on the FM waveband under the Restricted Service Licence scheme operated by Ofcom.

In recent years, the station has operated a number of projects aimed at a younger age group, typically 13- to 18-year-olds. Whilst the primary aims of the project remain unchanged, the station now has a more modern feel and broadcasts under the name WicKID fm to reflect its younger members and target audience.

Broadcasts

2008

Radio Bemerton's broadcast starts on 14 April and runs until 19 April 2008.  As with previous years the organisation will be broadcasting under the name WicKID fm on 87.8 FM.

External links
Wiltshire Community Media Foundation

Radio stations in Wiltshire
Radio stations established in 2000